Spiderdroid is a 1987 video game for the Atari 2600. It is a clone of Amidar (a more popular game that was in the arcades and also for the Atari 2600 in which this game is a hack of) with a more futuristic setting. The object of the game is to fill in boxes that have to be made by moving by its four corners. There is similarity to Pac-Man also. Instead of ghosts, spiders chase you while you are trying to complete your task (tribesmen and pigs are the foes in Amidar). This hacked version of Amidar for the Atari 2600 is based on another hack called Net Maker which was released in Europe by Suntek, & in Australia by Rainbow Vision.

References

1987 video games
Atari 2600 games
Atari 2600-only games
North America-exclusive video games
Maze games
Video game clones
Video games developed in the United States